The Cabinet of Evo Morales constituted the 210th to 220th cabinets of the Plurinational State of Bolivia. It was initially formed on 23 January 2006, a day after Evo Morales was sworn-in as the 65th president of Bolivia.

Cabinet ministers

History

Cabinets

Structural changes

References

Notes

Footnotes 

2006 establishments in Bolivia
2019 disestablishments in Bolivia
Cabinets of Bolivia
Cabinets established in 2006
Cabinets disestablished in 2019